The Holy Family with Angels is an oil painting on panel of  by Parmigianino in the Museo del Prado in Madrid.

It is usually identified with the "large painting" showing "Our Lady with the Christ Child on her neck taking fruit from an angel's lap and an old man with hairy arms" which Giorgio Vasari states Parmigianino produced just before leaving for Rome, adding that it was "made with skill and judgement". The painting was given to Pope Clement VII, who gave it to Ippolito de' Medici. By the early 17th century it was in Madrid in Pompeo Leoni's collection, which was divided after his death in 1608.

An early copy previously in San Quintino, Parma, is now in Rocca di Fontanellato. A preparatory study with various differences to the main work is now in the Cabinet des Dessins at the Louvre.

References

1524 paintings
Angels in art
Paintings of the Holy Family
Paintings of the Museo del Prado by Italian artists
Paintings of the Madonna and Child by Parmigianino